WMDR 1340 AM is an American AM radio station licensed to Augusta, Maine. It is owned by Light of Life Ministries and carries Salem Radio Network news and talk radio programming.

History
The 1340 frequency was previously known as WFAU; in 1994, its call letters and nostalgia format moved to 1280 AM, while 1340 became religious station WMDR. (The 1280 frequency became WJYE in 2014 and WHTP in 2020.) In May 1998, WMDR changed formats to a children's format, changing to Southern Gospel in late 2005, with the children's format moving to WMDR-FM. In March 2007, AM 1340 once again flipped formats with its FM counterpart, inheriting the Contemporary Christian format.

In 2009 the children's format was moved to an on demand section of their website  and 1340 changed to a Christian-based talk radio station.

Translators
In addition to the main station, WMDR is relayed by two FM translators.

External links
 Zap on Demand

Moody Radio affiliate stations
Radio stations established in 1946
Companies based in Augusta, Maine
1946 establishments in Maine
MDR (AM)